Jesus nut is a slang term for the main rotor retaining nut or mast nut, which holds the main rotor to the mast of some helicopters. The related slang term Jesus pin refers to the lock pin used to secure the retaining nut. More generally, Jesus nut (or Jesus pin) has been used to refer to any component that is a single point of failure which results in catastrophic consequences, and the only thing left to do is pray to Jesus, hence the name.

Origin of name
The term Jesus nut may have been coined by American soldiers in Vietnam; the Vietnam War was the first war to feature large numbers of soldiers riding in helicopters. The term may also have originated with the PBY Catalina, which had two Jesus bolts holding the wing onto the fuselage.

If the Jesus nut were to fail in flight, the rotor would detach from the helicopter and the only thing left for the crew to do would be to "pray to Jesus." The nut/pin must be checked before the flight even though real examples of the Jesus nut/pin failing are rare. For example, in 2000, the mast nut of a Bell 206B was removed to be repainted and was not restored and checked prior to a test flight. The helicopter crashed within ten minutes of takeoff, killing the two occupants. Some more recent helicopter systems do not have a Jesus nut.

Other contexts
More recently, the term has been more generically applied throughout engineering to include any single component whose failure would cause catastrophic failure of the entire system.

Another use for the term is found in rock climbing, in which it refers to the first piece of protection (some of which are also called "nuts") placed on a pitch. This piece must be placed to resist an outward pull as well as a downward pull in order to avoid the possibility of a "zipper", in which the outward pull on the rope from the belayer arresting a falling climber pulls protection pieces from the bottom up. In addition, the Jesus nut prevents the possibility of a factor-two fall onto the belay anchor.

In literature, the term "Jesus nut" was popularized in Chickenhawk by Robert Mason, a narrative about his experiences as a pilot in the Vietnam War.

See also
Circlip, also known as a "Jesus clip"
Linchpin

Notes

References

Fasteners
Helicopter components